Thomé and  Thome are French or German variants of the name Thomas which now appears as a surname and in placenames.

Places
Saint-Thomé, commune in the Ardèche department, France
São Thomé das Letras, city in Minas Gerais state, Brazil
San Thome Basilica, Roman Catholic cathedral in Chennai (Madras), India
Thome, ancient name of Ithome (Thessaly), in Greece

People
Thome Rodrigo (c. mid-1500s), Sri Lankan Sinhala Karava noble, signatory of the Convention of Malvana between the Kingdom of Portugal and the Kingdom of Kotte
André Thome (1879-1916), French politician. 
Delfina Thome (born 1996), Argentine field hockey player
Diane Thome (born 1942), American composer
Emerson Thome (born 1972), Brazilian former football player
Francis Thomé (1850–1909), French pianist and composer
Jim Thome (born 1970), Major League Baseball hitter
Joel Thome, American conductor
John M. Thome (1843–1908), American-Argentine astronomer
Johannes Thome, European psychiatrist and scientist
Otto Wilhelm Thomé (1840–1925), German botanist and botanical artist
Rudolf Thome (born 1939), German film director and producer
Verner Thomé (1878-1953), Finnish painter  
Xavier Noiret-Thomé (born 1971), French painter